Pathanapuram Block Panchayat is a Block Panchayat in Kollam district, Kerala state, India. The headquarters of this block panchayat is situated in Pidavoor, Pathanapuram.

Panchayats in the block
There are six Grama Panchayats in Pathanapuram Block Panchayat.

Vilakkudy
Thalavoor
Piravanthoor
Pathanapuram
Pattazhi
Pattazhi Vadakkekkara

References

External links
 Pathanapuram block panchayat office location

Geography of Kollam district